Alain Casabona (29 September 1950 – 16 May 2017) was a French novelist and short story writer. He won the Prix Alphonse-Allais from the Académie Alphonse Allais in 1994. He became a great chancellor of the Académie in 1996.

Works

References

1950 births
2017 deaths
Writers from Paris
French male novelists
20th-century French novelists
20th-century French male writers
21st-century French novelists
French male short story writers
French short story writers
21st-century French male writers